Shaisngi Lyngdoh (born 21 November 1988) is an Indian cricketer. He made his first-class debut on 4 February 2020, for Meghalaya in the 2019–20 Ranji Trophy.

References

External links
 

1988 births
Living people
Indian cricketers
Meghalaya cricketers
Place of birth missing (living people)